The Men's lightweight quadruple sculls event at the 2010 South American Games was held over March 22 at 9:20.

Medalists

Records

Results

References
Final

Lightweight Quadruple Scull M